"Born secret" and "born classified" are both terms which refer to a policy of information being classified from the moment of its inception, usually regardless of where it was created, and usually in reference to specific laws in the United States that are related to information that describes the operation of nuclear weapons.

It has been extensively used in reference to a clause in the Atomic Energy Act of 1946, which specified that all information about nuclear weapons and nuclear energy was to be considered "Restricted Data" (RD) until it had been officially declassified.

In the 1954 revision of the Act, the United States Atomic Energy Commission was given the power to declassify entire categories of information.

The "born secret" policy was created under the assumption that nuclear information could be so important to national security that it would need classification before it could be formally evaluated. The wording of the 1954 act specified as secret:

The constitutionality of declaring entire categories of information preemptively classified has not been definitively tested in the courts.

The legality of the "born secret" doctrine was directly challenged in a freedom of the press case in 1979 (United States v. The Progressive).  In that case, a magazine attempted to publish an account of the so-called "secret of the hydrogen bomb" (the Teller–Ulam design), which was apparently created without recourse to classified information.  Many analysts predicted that the US Supreme Court would, if it heard the case, reject the "born secret" clause as being an unconstitutional restraint on speech.  However, the government dropped the case as moot before it was resolved.

See also
 Classified information in the United States
 Invention Secrecy Act
 John Aristotle Phillips, a student who designed an A-bomb which was then classified as a "born secret".

References

External links
 Interview with George Stanford from 1994 on his experiences in the Progressive trial.

Nuclear secrecy
United States government secrecy